Marriages and Infidelities (1972) is the fourth volume of short stories by Joyce Carol Oates. In this collection, Oates explores the relationship between love and betrayal. 

Joyce Carol Oates's fourth collection of short stories is remarkable because of two aspects. First, some stories have the same titles as short stories or novellas by earlier writers: "The Metamorphosis" hints at Franz Kafka's short story "Die Verwandlung", "The Lady with the Pet Dog" at Anton Chekhov's novella "Die Dame mit dem Hündchen," "The Turn of the Screw" at Henry James's novella of the same title, and "The Dead" at the last short story of James Joyce's Dubliners. Oates has explained: "These stories are meant to be autonomous stories, yet they are also testaments of my love and extreme devotion to these other writers; I imagine a kind of spiritual 'marriage' between myself and them ...."  

Secondly, although the title suggests stories about marriages, about the traditional form of man-woman relationship and about its problems, Oates also uses the term "marriage" as a metaphor, as she has stated: I believe we achieve our salvation, or our ruin, by the marriages we contract. I conceived of a book of marriages. Some are conventional marriages of men and women, others are marriages in another sense - with a phase of art, with something that transcends the limitations of the ego. But because people are mortal, most of the marriages they go into are mistakes of some kind, misreadings of themselves. I thought by putting together a sequence of marriages, one might see how this one succeeds and that one fails. And how this one leads to some meaning beyond the self.

Stories
"The Sacred Marriage"
"Puzzle"
"Love and Death"
"29 Inventions"
"Problems of Adjustment in Survivors of Natural/Unnatural Disasters"
"By the River'
"Extraordinary Popular Delusions"
"Stalking"
"Scenes of Passion and Despair"
"Plot"
"The Children"
"Happy Onion"
"Normal Love"
"Stray Children"
"Wednesday's Child"
"Loving Losing Loving...a Man"
"Did You Ever Slip on Red Blood?"
"The Metamorphosis"
"Where I Lived, and What I Lived For"
"The Lady with the Pet Dog"
"The Spiral"
"The Turn of the Screw"
"The Dead"
"Nightmusic"

References 

Short story collections by Joyce Carol Oates
1972 short story collections
Vanguard Press books